Russia participated in the Junior Eurovision Song Contest 2019 which took place on 24 November 2019 in Gliwice, Poland. The Russian broadcaster All-Russia State Television and Radio Broadcasting Company (VGTRK) was responsible for organising their entry for the contest. Tatyana Mezhentseva and Denberel Oorzhak won the national final on 24 September 2019 with the song "Vremya dlya nas". The Russian organisation team later opted to change the name of the song to "A Time for Us".

Background

The twin sisters went on to become the first act from a Junior Eurovision Song Contest to represent their country at the Eurovision Song Contest, performing the song "Shine" at the Eurovision Song Contest 2014, in Copenhagen, Denmark. and in 2017, Polina Bogusevich with the song "Wings".Anna Filipchuk represented her country in Minsk, Belarus with the song "Unbreakable".She ended 10th out of 20 entries with 122 points.

Before Junior Eurovision

Akademiya Eurovision 2019 
The Russian broadcaster, VGTRK, announced on 4 December 2018 that they would be participating at the 2019 Contest. Submissions for entrants were open between 18 December to 20 March, with the audition stage taking place in the Russian capital, Moscow, in April 2019. VGTRK announced on 16 September that a total of eleven artists would be competing in the national final. The national selection of the entrant for Russia at the Junior Eurovision Song Contest 2019, took place at the Crocus City Hall in Moscow on 24 September 2019, and was televised a day later on 25 September. The winner was determined by a voting split of 50% jury members and 50% internet voting which opened on 17 September and closed on 23 September. Tatyana Mezhentseva and Denberel Oorzhak won the national final with the song "Vremya dlya nas".

Artist and song information

Tatyana Mezhentseva and Denberel Oorzhak

Tatyana Mezhentseva (born 14 December 2009) and Denberel Oorzhak (born 3 June 2006) are Russian child singers. They represented Russia at the Junior Eurovision Song Contest 2019 with the song "A Time for Us". Mezhentseva will go on and represent her country again in the Junior Eurovision Song Contest 2021 in Paris with the song "Mon Ami".

A Time for Us
"A Time for Us" is a song by Russian singers Tatyana Mezhentseva and Denberel Oorzhak. It represented Russia at the Junior Eurovision Song Contest 2019.

At Junior Eurovision
During the opening ceremony and the running order draw which both took place on 18 November 2019, Russia was drawn to perform third on 24 November 2019, following France and preceding North Macedonia.

Voting

Detailed voting results

References

Junior Eurovision Song Contest
Russia
2019